Adriano Basso (born 18 April 1975) is a retired Brazilian footballer who played as a goalkeeper. He is currently the goalkeeper coach at Sheffield Wednesday.

Basso began his playing career in his native Brazil before entering English league football with Bristol City for whom he remained for five years. After being released in 2010, he signed a short-term deal with Wolverhampton Wanderers the following year and then spent his last season at Hull City.

Career
Basso previously played for Ponte Preta and Atlético Paranaense in his homeland before moving to England. He had an unsuccessful three-month trial with Arsenal before joining non-league sides St Albans City and Woking.

He eventually signed for League One side Bristol City shortly after the 2005–06 campaign had begun, making his first team debut against Swindon Town on 11 November 2005. He quickly established himself as the club's first choice goalkeeper and was part of the team that won promotion to the Championship in the following season, also being crowned BBC West's Footballer of the Year.

The 2007–08 season saw Basso came within one game of reaching the Premier League, but the Robins lost the Championship Play-off Final to Hull City.

He remained the club's number one for the following campaign that saw a mid-table finish, but in July 2009 it was reported that he had rejected a new contract and subsequently handed in a transfer request. Despite rumours of moves to other clubs in the close season, Basso remained at the club for the majority of the 2009–10 season, but made only four appearances, as relations soured between him and the club. On 5 March 2010, his contract was terminated, ending his five-year stay at the club.

Basso remained a free agent until 31 January 2011, when he joined Premier League side Wolverhampton Wanderers on a short-term contract until the end of the season, after having trained with the club for two weeks. Following the end of his contract at Wolves, Basso was a free agent for a short while before moving to Hull City on a one-year contract, with the option of a second in the club's favour, after a successful trial. He made his debut on 9 August 2011 at the KC Stadium in a 0–2 defeat by Macclesfield Town in the League Cup. He made his league debut on 20 August 2011 at the KC Stadium in a 0–1 defeat by Crystal Palace. He played for F.C. United of Manchester in the second half of their pre-season friendly versus Hereford F.C. at Broadhurst Park on Saturday 23 July 2016, but eventually he went on to sign for Truro City in August.

In December 2016, having been released by Truro City, Basso joined F.C. United of Manchester. He left the club in March 2017 to join Hartlepool United as a goalkeeper coach.

In August 2017 he rejoined FC United as goalkeeping cover. and also played for Radcliffe Borough

Coaching career
On 21 March 2017, Basso joined Hartlepool United as a goalkeeper coach. At the end of the season, Basso left the club.

Basso then joined Nuneaton Borough on 2 August 2018 as goalkeeper coach, but was also registered as a player. He was at the club until 6 February 2019, when he joined Grantham Town, also as a goalkeeper coach.

On the 25 June 2021, he was appointed the new first team goalkeeper coach at Sheffield Wednesday.

Personal life
Basso is a devout Christian.

References

External links

1975 births
Living people
People from Jundiaí
Brazilian footballers
Association football goalkeepers
Associação Atlética Ponte Preta players
Club Athletico Paranaense players
St Albans City F.C. players
Woking F.C. players
Bristol City F.C. players
Wolverhampton Wanderers F.C. players
Hull City A.F.C. players
English Football League players
Expatriate footballers in England
Brazilian expatriate sportspeople in England
F.C. United of Manchester players
Radcliffe F.C. players
Nuneaton Borough F.C. players
Hartlepool United F.C. non-playing staff
Association football goalkeeping coaches
Footballers from São Paulo (state)